The 2019–20 Gaza Strip Premier League was the 2019–20 season of the Gaza Strip Premier League, the top football league in the Gaza Strip of Palestine. The season started on 31 August 2019 and ended on 11 March 2020.

Teams 
A total of 12 teams competed in the league. Khidmat Rafah were the defending champions. Al-Ahli Beit Hanoun and Khidmat Khan Yunis were relegated from last season, and were replaced by promoted teams Beit Hanoun and Al-Ahli Gaza.

 Al-Ahli Gaza
 Al-Hilal Gaza
 Al-Ittihad Khan Yunis
 Al-Ittihad Shuja'iyya
 Al-Sadaqah
 Beit Hanoun
 Gaza Sports Club
 Khidmat Al-Shatia
 Khidmat Rafah
 Shabab Jabalia
 Shabab Khan Yunis
 Shabab Rafah

League table

References 
https://www.rsssf.org/tablesp/pales2020.html#gaza

Gaza Strip Premier League seasons